The University of the Philippines Open University (UPOU) is a public research and open university and distance education institution headquartered in the town of Los Baños, Laguna, with satellite offices in Quezon City, Metro Manila. It is the fifth constituent university of the University of the Philippines System.

Established in 1995 as the UP Distance Education Program. UPOU offers both graduate and undergraduate degrees as well as diploma courses and Professional Teaching Certificates (PTC) to Filipino students in more than 70 countries. It also offers MOOCs on various subjects through its official platform, Massive Open Distance eLearning (MODeL), and hosts its degree programs through its official student portal, MyPortal, both learning platforms were developed using a free and open-source learning management system called Moodle.

As of 2019, UPOU had 4,086 students enrolled in various programs representing 7.3% of the student population of the entire university system. This makes it the 4th largest constituent university by student population after UP Manila, and just slightly more than UP Visayas, which had 7.2%, while having the smallest budget of any constituent university.

UPOU is a member of the International Council for Open and Distance Education (ICDE).

History 
University of the Philippines Open University was established on February 23, 1995, as the fifth constituent university of the University of the Philippines System. It is mandated by Republic Act No. 10650, also known as the Open and Distance Learning Act of 2014, to assist the Commission on Higher Education (CHED) and the Technical Education and Skills Development Authority (TESDA) in their open distance learning functions.

Academics

The U.P. Open University delivers its programs and courses through distance education (DE). Learners study in an independent self-learning style using specially designed learning materials and resources. Teaching and learning is mediated through the use of technology like print, audio, video and the internet. Students interact with their instructors and each other through virtual classrooms, email and web conferencing. UP Open University also uses short-messaging system (SMS) for distance learning which in has become a subject of study by the Virtual University of Pakistan. Almost all courses are offered through online learning mode.

Faculties 
 Faculty of Education (FEd) covers the following range of areas of study: general education, alternative education, language and literacy education, science and mathematics teaching, social studies education, and distance education.
 Faculty of Information & Communication Studies (FICS) offers degree programs in communication, information systems, computer science, and multimedia studies.
 Faculty of Management and Development Studies (FMDS) offers a range of postgraduate programs in R&D management, environment and natural resources management, land valuation and management, public management, social work, nursing, hospital administration, and public health as well as non-formal programs in entrepreneurship, health, and land valuation.

Research
U.P. Open University conducts research in distance education (DE) and the disciplines it currently offers.

The university has spearheaded research in open and distance learning in the country. Its research in this area has delved into the following topics: DE learner profile, learning styles, and learner performance; online teaching and learning; virtual learning environments; computer-mediated collaborative learning; gender and distance education; pedagogical approaches in distance education; DE program evaluation; and management of DE.

In addition, the university has also pursued research in the following discipline-based areas: education, information and communication technology; multimedia, communication, organization and management; public policy, environment, health, and development studies. Many of these discipline-based studies have been externally funded.

Learning centers 

The U.P. Open University has several learning centers located in other U.P. campuses and state universities in selected regions of the country. These centers are the venues where students can conduct and seek advice on transactions, activities and procedures regarding application for admission, registration, student orientation, distribution of course materials, dropping of subjects, filing leave of absence, examinations, accessing library materials, face-to-face tutorials (if available) and tutorials on basic computer and internet literacy. The university also has a virtual learning center, where all transactions and procedures are conducted and communicated online.

Headquarters

The U.P. Open University Headquarters is located in Los Baños, Laguna, close to the International Rice Research Institute. Its main administrative and annex buildings house the main offices of the university, including the Office of the Chancellor (OC), the Office of the Vice Chancellor for Academic Affairs (OVCAA), the Office of the Vice Chancellor for Finance and Administration (OVCFA), and the Faculties of Studies Offices. The Centennial Center for Digital Learning (CCDL) Auditorium is also in this complex.

A major landmark in the UPOU Headquarters is the U.P. Open University Oblation sculpture that stands in the Oblation Plaza in front of the main building. UPOU's Oblation stands on a pedestal with a ribbon-like flag swirling around the pedestal and the Oblation. This gives the effect of the flag lifting the Oblation into greater heights and gives it the boundless reach that is symbolic of UPOU's prime objective of widening access to UP quality education. It was designed and executed by University Artist and UPOU Chancellor Dr. Grace J. Alfonso in 2005. The Oblation Plaza is also where the annual commencement exercises are held.

The university also maintains a satellite office at the National Computer Center Building in Diliman, Quezon City. In the future, the university will move to a new campus in New Clark City in Capas, Tarlac.

Academic affiliation 
UPOU maintains membership in the follow local and international academic associations:

Local 

 Philippine Society for Distance Learning (PSDL)

International 

 International Council for Open and Distance Education (ICDE)
 Asian Association of Open Universities (AAOU)
 Association of Pacific Rim Universities (APRU)

Notable alumni

 Jejomar Binay - Diploma in Environment and Natural Resource Management graduate. Former Mayor of Makati and former Vice President of the Philippines.
 Juan Miguel Zubiri - Graduate, Master in Environment and Natural Resources Management. Senator of the Philippines and former Bukidnon 3rd district representative.
 Sarah Geronimo - Graduate, Associate in Arts. Singer.
 Cathy Untalan - Diploma in Environment and Natural Resource Management. Beauty pageant.

See also

List of open universities
Virtual university
Open learning
Distance education

Notes 

UPOU MODeL
MyPortal (student portal)

References

External links

University of the Philippines
Universities and colleges in Laguna (province)
Research universities in the Philippines
Distance education institutions based in the Philippines
Graduate schools in the Philippines
Education in Los Baños, Laguna